North Island—Powell River  is a federal electoral district in British Columbia, Canada, that was represented in the House of Commons of Canada from 1988 to 1997, and again from 2015 onward.  This riding was created in 1987 from parts of Comox—Powell River riding. The electoral district was abolished in 1996 when it was merged into Vancouver Island North riding.

The riding consisted of the southern part of Kitimat-Stikine Regional District, the Central Coast Regional District, the Mount Waddington Regional District, the northwest part of the Comox-Strathcona Regional District, the Sunshine Coast Regional District, and the Powell River Regional District, except Electoral Area E.

North Island—Powell River was re-created (initially called Vancouver Island North—Comox—Powell River) by the 2012 federal electoral boundaries redistribution and was legally defined in the 2013 representation order. It came into effect upon the call of the 42nd Canadian federal election, which was held 19 October 2015.

Demographics

Members of Parliament

Electoral history

North Island—Powell River, 2015–present

North Island—Powell River, 1988–1997

See also 

 List of Canadian federal electoral districts
 Past Canadian electoral districts

Notes

References

External links 
Riding history from the Library of Parliament

British Columbia federal electoral districts
British Columbia federal electoral districts on Vancouver Island
Campbell River, British Columbia
Courtenay, British Columbia
Powell River, British Columbia